Jimmy Connolly was an Ireland international footballer.

International career
On 21 March 1926, Connolly made his only appearance for Ireland in a 3–0 defeat to Italy in Turin.

References

Republic of Ireland association footballers
Association football defenders
Irish Free State association footballers
Irish Free State international footballers
Fordsons F.C. players
League of Ireland players
Year of birth missing
Place of birth missing
Year of death missing